is a passenger railway station on the Minato Line in the city of Hitachinaka, Ibaraki, Japan, operated by the third-sector railway operator Hitachinaka Seaside Railway.

Lines

Station layout
The station has a single side platform serving traffic in both directions. The station building is a portion of a local supermarket. The station was modernized in 2011 with toilets and wheelchair accessibility.

History
Hiraiso Station opened on 3 September 1924 as a station on the Minato Railway.

Passenger statistics
In fiscal 2011, the station was used by an average of 144 passengers daily.

Surrounding area
Hiraiso Post Office
Hiraiso swimming beach

See also
 List of railway stations in Japan

References

External links

 Hitachinaka Seaside Railway station information 

Railway stations in Ibaraki Prefecture
Railway stations in Japan opened in 1924
Hitachinaka, Ibaraki